Elizabeth Katz is a Mexican actress and former model. She was born in France.

After obtaining a small role in the telenovela La casa al final de la calle ("The house at the end of the street") on Televisa, she obtained the role of a French model in Amor de Nadie. In 1995, she took on the role of "Mariana" in the Mexican film Mujeres infieles ("Unfaithful women").

Films
 La mujer de los dos (1996)
 Mujeres infieles (1995) as Mariana
 Camarena vive (1990)

Telenovelas
 Morir dos veces (1996) as Lucy
 Amor de nadie (1990) as Ivette
 La casa al final de la calle (1988) as Eva (young)

References

External links
 

Year of birth missing (living people)
Living people
French emigrants to Mexico
Mexican female models
Mexican film actresses
Mexican telenovela actresses